Sandeep Johri (born December 20, 1962) is the former CEO of Tricentis, an IT testing software company.

Career
Johri joined Tricentis in 2013 as CEO.

Before joining Tricentis, Johri served as the COO of Appcelerator, an open source mobile application development platform.

Previously, he was Vice President of Strategy and Industry Solutions at Hewlett-Packard, where he also served as Vice President of Corporate Development.

Johri was also instrumental in the formation of two startups, Determina and Bluelane, both of which were later acquired by VMware. Additionally, he was the CEO and founder of Oblix (acquired by Oracle), and co-founded eBoodle (now Shopzilla), one of the first ecommerce comparison shopping services.

Johri was also responsible for HP's $4.5B acquisition of Mercury Interactive: the largest deal to date in software testing space.

Biography
Johri was born in Gwalior, India on December 20, 1962. Johri has an MBA from Stanford University, a master's degree in Industrial Engineering from Wayne State University, Detroit, and a bachelor's degree in Mechanical Engineering from University of Pune, India.

Johri has been involved as an advisor and investor in various startups in Silicon Valley and India, including Mayfield Fund, alphonso, Cenzic (acquired by Trustwave Holdings), Dhingana (acquired by Rdio), and Shopalize (acquired by 24/7 Customer). Johri also served as co-chair staff on President Bill Clinton's National Information Infrastructure Advisory Council on issues related to the United States government's "Information Superhighway" initiative.

He was inducted into the Wayne University Hall of Fame in 2012.

References 

Businesspeople in software
American computer businesspeople
American technology chief executives
1962 births
Living people